Edmund Plantagenet may refer to:

Edmund, Earl of Rutland (1443–1460), son of Richard, Duke of York
Edmund of Woodstock, 1st Earl of Kent (1301–1330)
Edmund, 2nd Earl of Kent
Edmund Crouchback, 1st Earl of Leicester and Lancaster, Crusader, son of King Henry III of England
Prince Edmund (Blackadder), Prince Edmund Plantagenet, the main character of the first series of Blackadder